William Whitby (died March–October 1655) was a Virginia politician and landowner. He served as a burgess 1642–44, in the early stages of the English Civil War, and again from 1652–55, after Virginia surrendered to Parliamentary control. During the 1640s he was a justice of the Warwick County court. He served as Speaker of the Virginia House of Burgesses in the 1653 session, following the one-day speakership of Walter Chiles.

Notes

References

1655 deaths
English emigrants
Speakers of the Virginia House of Burgesses
Politicians from Newport News, Virginia
Year of birth unknown